Two vessels of the Royal Australian Navy have been named HMAS Dubbo, for the town of Dubbo, New South Wales.

, a Bathurst-class corvette which entered service in 1942 and was sold for scrap in 1958
, a Fremantle-class patrol boat that entered service in 1984 and was decommissioned in 2007

Battle honours
Ships named HMAS Dubbo are entitled to carry a single battle honour:
 Pacific 1942–45

References

Royal Australian Navy ship names